Seymour George Bankoff (October 7, 1921 – July 14, 2011) was an American chemical engineer.

Bankoff was born on October 7, 1921 and raised in Brooklyn. He received bachelor's and master's degrees in mineral dressing at Columbia University. Bankoff then worked for the Manhattan Project between stints at DuPont. In 1948, he began teaching at Rose Polytechnic Institute and concurrently earned a Ph.D from Purdue University. Bankoff joined the Northwestern University faculty in 1959, where he was appointed the Walter P. Murphy Professor of Chemical and Mechanical Engineering. In 1966, Bankoff was named a Guggenheim fellow. Over the course of his career, Bankoff was also granted fellowship in the American Institute of Chemical Engineers and the American Society of Mechanical Engineers, as well as a membership in the National Academy of Engineering. He died on July 14, 2011 at Evanston Hospital, aged 89.

References

1921 births
2011 deaths
American chemical engineers
DuPont people
Manhattan Project people
Columbia School of Engineering and Applied Science alumni
Purdue University College of Engineering alumni
Rose–Hulman Institute of Technology
Northwestern University faculty
Fellows of the American Society of Mechanical Engineers
Fellows of the American Institute of Chemical Engineers
Scientists from Brooklyn
Engineers from New York City